Drakenberg is a Swedish surname. Notable people with the surname include:

 Hans Drakenberg (1901–1982), Swedish fencer at the 1936 Summer Olympics
 Otto Drakenberg (born 1966), Swedish fencer
 Christian Jacobsen Drakenberg, Norwegian centenarian

See also
 Drakensberg, highest mountain range in Southern Africa

Swedish-language surnames